Maranguape Futebol Clube, commonly known as Maranguape, is a Brazilian football club based in Maranguape, Ceará state.

History
The club was founded on November 17, 1997. They competed for the first time in the Campeonato Cearense in 2002, when they finished in the third position.

Stadium
Maranguape Futebol Clube play their home games at Estádio Francisco Cardoso de Moraes, nicknamed Moraisão. The stadium has a maximum capacity of 5,000 people.

References

Association football clubs established in 1997
Football clubs in Ceará
1997 establishments in Brazil